The 2017 Ligue Haïtienne season is the 54th season of top-tier football in Haiti. It began on 4 March 2017. The league is split into two tournaments—the Série d'Ouverture and the Série de Clôture—each with identical formats and each contested by the same 16 teams.

In a change from last year, the number of teams in the league has been reduced from 18 to 16. Also, the playoffs for both seasons have been changed, having 6 teams qualify with seeds 3 through 6 starting in the quarterfinals and the 1 and 2 seeds starting in the semifinals.

Teams

At the end of the 2016 season, the bottom 4 teams in the aggregate table; Aigle Noir AC, Roulado FC, Inter, and Violette AC; were relegated to the Haitian second-level leagues. Replacing them were two clubs from the Haitian second-level leagues; Éclair AC and AS Sud-Est.

Réal du Cap has changed its name to Real Hope FA.

Série d'Ouverture

The 2017 Série d'Ouverture began on 4 March 2017 and ended on 25 June 2017.

Regular season

Standings

Results

Playoffs

Quarterfinals

Semifinals

Finals

Série de Clôture

The 2017 Série de Clôture began on 13 September 2017 and ended on 24 December 2017.

Regular season

Standings

Results

Playoffs

Quarterfinals

Semifinals

The second leg between AS Mirebalais and Racing FC was abandoned in injury time due to an attack on the referee. The 1–0 scoreline at the time was allowed to stand and a playoff between the sides would determine who advanced to the finals. Racing FC won the playoff 2-0 and advanced to the final.

Finals

Trophée des Champions
This match is contested between the winner of the Série d'Ouverture and the winner of the Série de Clôture.

Aggregate table

References

External links
RSSSF

2017
Haiti
Haiti
2017 in Haitian sport